Flight Log: Departure is the fifth extended play by South Korean boy band Got7. It was released on March 21, 2016 by JYP Entertainment with it being the first entry in their Flight Log series. The songs "Fly" and "Home Run" were used to promote the album.

Track listing

Chart performance

Album

Singles
"Fly"

Sales

Awards and nominations

Music programs

Gaon Chart K-Pop Awards

|-
| 2017
| Flight Log: Departure
| Album of the Year (1st Quarter)
|

References

2016 EPs
Dance-pop EPs
Korean-language EPs
JYP Entertainment EPs
Genie Music EPs
Got7 EPs